Joseph Ray Bunn Stallins (born May 18, 1975) is an American former professional basketball player. At 6'6" tall and 232 lbs. (105 kg) in weight, he played at the power forward and center positions.

Professional career
Bunn played college ball at the North Carolina A & T University (1994–95) where he was named MEAC Rookie of the Year. From there, he transferred to the Old Dominion University (1995–96) and Phillips University (1997–98) in the NAIA.

He was signed for the 1998–99 season by the Lucentum Alicante in the Spanish LEB league. The following season, he played for Lleida, still in the LEB and then moved to Argentina in 2000–2001 and signed with Penarol Mar Del Plata.

Bunn was the Argentine top-tier level Liga Nacional de Básquet (LNB)'s Top Scorer five times (2001, 2002, 2004, 2006, 2011).

Player career 
1994/95  North Carolina A&T Aggies
1995/96  Old Dominion Monarchs
1997/98  Phillips University
1998/99  Lucentum Alicante
1999/00  Caprabo Lleida
2000/01  Peñarol
2000/01  Gaiteros
2000/01  Metropolitanos
2000/01  Indios
2001/02  Atenas
2001/02  Red Bull Thunder
2001/02  Toros
2002/03  Cantabria Baloncesto
2002/03  Metropolitanos
2002/03  Capitanes
2002/03  Toritos
2003/04  Peñarol
2004/05  Anyang Stars
2004/05  Gallitos
2004/05  Guaiqueries
2005/06  Peñarol
2006/07  Viola Reggio Calabria
2006/07  Maratonistas de Coamo
2007/08  BCM Gravelines
2008/09  Andrea Costa Imola
2009/10 San Martín de Marcos Juárez
2009/11  Argentino de Junín
2011/13  Fuerza Guinda de Nogales
2013  Estudiantes de Concordia
2013  Tomás de Rocamora

External links
Joseph Bunn Profile
sports-reference college stats
REALGM.com Profile
basketball-reference profile
eurobasket player profile

1975 births
Living people
American expatriate basketball people in Argentina
American expatriate basketball people in the Dominican Republic
American expatriate basketball people in France
American expatriate basketball people in Italy
American expatriate basketball people in Mexico
American expatriate basketball people in the Philippines
American expatriate basketball people in South Korea
American expatriate basketball people in Spain
American expatriate basketball people in Venezuela
American men's basketball players
Andrea Costa Imola players
Anyang KGC players
Argentino de Junín basketball players
Atenas basketball players
Barako Bull Energy Boosters players
Basketball players from New York (state)
BCM Gravelines players
Cantabria Baloncesto players
CB Lucentum Alicante players
Centers (basketball)
Club San Martín de Corrientes basketball players
Fuerza Guinda de Nogales players
Gaiteros del Zulia players
Guaiqueríes de Margarita players
Maratonistas de Coamo players
North Carolina A&T Aggies men's basketball players
Old Dominion Monarchs men's basketball players
Peñarol de Mar del Plata basketball players
Philippine Basketball Association imports
Phillips Haymakers men's basketball players
Power forwards (basketball)
Viola Reggio Calabria players